Floating Dragon is a horror novel by American writer  Peter Straub, originally published by Underwood-Miller in November 1982 and G.P. Putnam's Sons in February 1983.

Synopsis
Set during the spring and summer of 1980, the novel deals with events that befall the affluent suburb of Hampstead, Connecticut.

An adulterous housewife named Stony Friedgood picks up a man at a bar, but is brutally murdered by the patron. At the same time, her husband Leo, working with the Department of Defense, is involved in the cover up of DRG-16, a nerve gas that escapes its containment and rushes into the town of Hampstead. Leo works to stop the public from finding out about the gas that leaked, which already killed three men at the lab. When he arrives home, the gas is above Hampstead, causing deaths and hallucinations.

Meanwhile, the descendants of the founders of Hampstead have returned: Richard Allbee, a former child actor turned architect with a wife and child on the way, returns from London and is plagued by dreams and visions of his former co-actor Billy Bentley, who died; Graham Williams, an old historian who murdered a serial killer in his past, and discovered a cycle of evil in the town that arrives every thirty years in the name of a monster named the Dragon; Patsy McCloud, the abused wife of Les McCloud, who has psychic abilities; and Tabby Smithfield, a young child with an alcoholic father, who has similar abilities like Patsy. The four connect with each other and learn from Graham that an older evil has poisoned the town and wreaks havoc, as is happening at that moment.

Several of the locals experience frightening visions they believe was brought on by DRG, but was in fact created by the Dragon. The Dragon, originally businessman Gideon Winter, had bought land from the town centuries ago and killed women and children, was discovered and murdered by the founders, leading to his vendetta against the town and its inhabitants. The Dragon would possess people each cycle to commit atrocities, such as Bates Krell. Williams had confronted Bates Krell years ago and murdered him, after discovering his acts of villainy. Williams then devoted himself to uncover the history which he shares with the other three.

Tabby reluctantly accompanies three teenage robbers on their trip to doctor Wren Van Horne's home, where they are attacked and killed; several children drown themselves on the town beach; policemen murder each other during an annual meeting at a movie theater; a group of firefighters die when they spontaneously combust trying to stop several houses from burning; Leo escapes town but dies in the streets of New York; and local reporter Sarah Spry and her friend Ulick Byrne attempt to uncover the secret of Hampstead.

More evil and terrifying hallucinations brought on by the Dragon destroy the town and send the townsfolk away. The four are no stranger as they watch firsthand the town crumble. As the novel progresses, the Dragon gets more hostile trying to split the group and demotivate them: Les McCloud, Patsy's husband, is killed during a drive after a dog kills itself when it crashed into his car; Richard comes home from his work to see his wife murdered, while pregnant; Tabby's home catches fire, and his father kills his stepmother, and they are consumed by the flames; and Graham visits Kendall Point, a place of terror in town, and nearly falls to his death.

The government discovers the slip and failed coverup of DRG as reporters and news stations discover the events happening in Hampstead. Sarah and Ulick, after investigating, arrive at the home of former killer Bates Krell and are attacked by Wren Van Horne, who became the new host of the Dragon and murdered several locals, including Stony Friedgood. Tabby arrives at Van Horne's manor with Patsy, in an attempt to stop the Dragon single-handedly like Graham previously. They meet one of the surviving thieves, Bruce Norman, who helps them break in. They easily shoot and kill Van Horne, but a celestial form of the Dragon kidnaps Tabby and burns the house down. At the same time, Graham and Richard, figuring out what Tabby planned to do, are attacked by an indestructible dog at Williams' home, but manage to escape with Graham's shotgun.

The two, along with Patsy, journey to Krell's home and are hit with vivid hallucinations, like dead beings emerging from the basement floor and blood inside the basement. They enter a tunnel and several caverns where each individual is tested by the Dragon: Patsy sees the victims of the Dragon in a chamber, in them Sarah, Ulick, and her husband Les; Richard returns to the set of the show he acted in and is attacked by Billy Bentley, but learns to accept his death; and Graham is embarrassed for his infidelity with his wives and accusations of being a communist. They arrive underneath Kendall Point, and rescue Tabby. The Dragon appears, in the form of a literal dragon, and causes an earthquake.

The four enter a large cave created by the Dragon. Patsy unites the group with her powers, and gives them the strength and courage to face the Dragon. Singing “When the Red, Red, Robin Comes Bob, Bob, Bobbin’ Along,” Richard uses a shotgun which transforms into a sword to stab the Dragon and kill him, seemingly ending the cycle. The four escape Kendall Point before it cracks and falls into the ocean, along with Van Horne’s mansion and a few buildings. The four recoup at Graham’s home where it is fully revealed that the novel was written by Graham on the suggestion of Richard.

The novel ends with Patsy moving with a new boyfriend to New York, then somewhere south, Richard getting a new wife and daughter, adopting Tabby, who goes to college, and Graham publishing Floating Dragon and being promised by Patsy to meet again soon.

Main characters

Richard Allbee: an architect and former child actor in his mid-thirties, and a descendant of one of the four original families that settled Hampstead (then called Greenbank) in 1645.  As a young boy, Richard starred as the youngest child on a Leave It to Beaver-style family sitcom called Daddy's Here that aired in the 1950s.  As an adult, Richard is plagued by memories of his former co-star, Billy Bentley, who played his character's older brother on the series, and was later shot in an altercation over drugs, after sliding into a life of petty crime and drug abuse.

Graham Williams: a novelist and screenwriter whose career was destroyed when he was labeled a Communist sympathizer for refusing to testify before the House Unamerican Activities Committee.  Born and raised in Hampstead, Williams had his first brush with the sinister forces plaguing the town as a young man, when he discovered the identity of a serial killer, Bates Krell, responsible for the deaths of several local women, and later killed the man during a violent confrontation.  Afterward, Williams (who, like Richard, is also a descendant of one of the original founding families) became obsessed with researching the history of the town, eventually discovering a "cycle" of death and mayhem that seems to visit the area once in a generation (or approximately once every thirty-odd years).

Patsy McCloud. Also a descendant of one of the founding families, Patsy (like her grandmother before her) is possessed of a variety of psychic abilities, including telepathy, precognition, post-cognition, and, in particular, the ability to know when people she encounters are near death.  After spending most of her life trying to suppress her abilities, she learns to embrace them after meeting Graham, Richard, and Tabby Smithfield, a young boy with similar powers.

Tabby Smithfield: the last descendant of the town's founding families, Tabby is a 13-year-old boy with various psychic abilities similar to those possessed by Patsy McCloud; after their discovery of the powers they share, Patsy and Tabby form a close bond.  Though born into wealth and privilege, Tabby has spent most of his life moving from city to city with his father, Clark Smithfield, whose alcoholism and inability to hold down a steady job have left Tabby without much stability in his life.  Tabby's mother was killed in a car accident when he was six years old.

Gideon Winter (also known as The Dragon): a fifth settler who arrived in Greenbank not long after the original four families and quickly bought up most of the land in town.  Winter (dubbed "the Dragon" by local farmers, presumably because of his ruthless business practices) disappeared mysteriously following a rash of child murders in the area; Graham Williams believes he was murdered by members of the four families, thus leading to his centuries-long vendetta against the citizens of Hampstead, and particularly the descendants of the town's founding fathers.  According to Graham, Winter's spirit returns to the area approximately once every thirty years to commit a series of murders; the end of each cycle is usually marked by a large-scale disaster of some sort (an earthquake in one case, a fire that destroys half the town in another).  The novel is unclear as to whether the spirit of Winter is responsible for all the apparently supernatural happenings in the town, or if some other, older evil may have plagued the area since before human habitation.  It is strongly implied although never explicitly stated in the novel that each of the four protagonists is descended from Winter through illegitimate children borne by the wives of the town's founders, and that this may be the source of Patsy and Tabby's psychic abilities.

1983 American novels
Fiction set in 1980
American horror novels
Novels by Peter Straub
Novels set in Connecticut